American band Death Grips has released six studio albums, one compilation album, four extended plays (EPs), one mixtape, seven singles, eight promotional singles, three remixes, and 47 music videos. The band was formed by MC Ride, Zach Hill, and Andy Morin in Sacramento, California during the winter of 2010.

In March 2011, Death Grips released its eponymous debut EP. The band's mixtape Exmilitary followed a month later and was praised by contemporary music critics. Death Grips signed a record deal with Epic Records in early 2012 and its debut studio album The Money Store was released in April to critical acclaim, peaking at number 130 on the Billboard 200 chart. Because Epic Records would not confirm a release date for their second studio album No Love Deep Web before 2013, Death Grips self-released the album in October 2012. As a result of this and the ensuing conflict between the band and the record label, Death Grips was dropped by Epic Records. No Love Deep Web received positive reviews and topped the BitTorrent list of most-legally downloaded music, with 34,151,432 downloads.

In July 2013, Death Grips launched Third Worlds, an imprint label of Harvest Records. The band made their subsequent releases on this label. Their third album, Government Plates, was released in November 2013, to favorable reviews. Death Grips' fourth studio album, The Powers That B, is a double album consisting of two discs titled Niggas on the Moon and Jenny Death. In June 2014, Niggas on the Moon was released. Between the releases of the two halves of this double album, the instrumental album Fashion Week was released in January 2015. The second half, Jenny Death was highly anticipated and the complete double album was released in March 2015 to positive reviews, peaking at number 72 on the Billboard 200 chart. The Powers That B was followed by an instrumental EP titled Interview 2016, released in March 2016.

In May 2016, Death Grips released their fifth studio album, Bottomless Pit, which was met with positive reviews and peaked at number 193 on the Billboard 200 chart. The physical vinyl release of the compilation album Fashion Week/Interview 2016 was released in November of that year. In March 2018, Death Grips released the title for its sixth studio album, Year of the Snitch, which was released in June 2018.

Albums

Studio albums

Instrumental albums

Compilation albums

Mixtapes

EPs

Singles

Commercial singles

Promotional singles

Guest appearances

Remixes

Music videos

Notes

References

Discographies of American artists
Hip hop discographies